William Arthur Francis Candy (19 June 1934 – 25 June 2019) was a New Zealand cyclist who represented his country at the 1962 British Empire and Commonwealth Games and 1964 Olympic Games.

At the 1962 British Empire and Commonwealth Games in Perth, Western Australia, Candy competed on the track in the 10-mile scratch race and 4000 m individual pursuit. He was unplaced in the scratch race, while in the individual pursuit he was eliminated in the quarter-finals, defeated by Charlie McCoy from England.

Candy competed on the road for New Zealand at the 1964 Olympics in Tokyo. Alongside Laurie Byers, Richard Johnstone and Max Grace, he rode in the team time trial, finishing in 18th place.

Candy died in Rotorua on 25 June 2019.

References

External links
 

1934 births
2019 deaths
New Zealand male cyclists
Olympic cyclists of New Zealand
Cyclists at the 1964 Summer Olympics
Sportspeople from Palmerston North
Cyclists at the 1962 British Empire and Commonwealth Games
Commonwealth Games competitors for New Zealand